Jeremiah Gates Brainard (c. 1759 – January 14, 1830) was a justice of the Connecticut Supreme Court from 1808 to 1829.

Originally elected to the court following the adoption of a new state constitution in 1807, Brainard was the only judge whose tenure survived a political purge in 1817:

Brainard was the father of poet John Gardiner Calkins Brainard. Brainard "resigned his place on the bench in 1829, his health not being equal to the duties of the office, having served as judge for twenty-two years". He died in New London, Connecticut, the following year, at the age of seventy.

References

Justices of the Connecticut Supreme Court
Connecticut Federalists
1759 births
1830 deaths
Year of birth uncertain